Eusene was a town of ancient Pontus, not far from the coast, a little to the northwest of Amisus. The Tabula Peutingeriana calls it Ezene. The anonymous Geographer of Ravenna calls it Aezene and Ecene.

Its site is tentatively located near Incesukahvesi in Asiatic Turkey.

References

Populated places in ancient Pontus
Former populated places in Turkey
History of Samsun Province